Martyn Keith Roper  (born 8 June 1965) is a British diplomat and civil servant who had been Governor of the Cayman Islands since 29 October 2018.

Roper was the British Ambassador to Algeria from 2010 to 2014. He was appointed OBE in 2013 "for services to UK interests in Algeria, particularly the UK response to the In Amenas hostage crisis".

References

External links 
 Cayman Islands Government Web Site

1965 births
Alumni of the Open University
Alumni of the University of Hull
Ambassadors of the United Kingdom to Algeria
Governors of the Cayman Islands
Living people
People educated at Heath Grammar School